Lush House is an Australian lifestyle television series that first aired on The LifeStyle Channel on Monday, 27 April 2009 at 7:30pm.

The show is presented by Shannon Lush, who visits households in need of a major clean-up and helps the families discover what is the best cleaning solutions for them and their lifestyles. It also offers tips on cleaning their homes in an eco-friendly way. The series has an original first series order of 10 episodes.

References

External links
 Official website

2009 Australian television series debuts